Martha Johnson Patterson (October 25, 1828 – July 10, 1901) was the eldest child of Andrew Johnson, the 17th President of the United States and his wife, Eliza McCardle. She served as the White House hostess during her father's administration and directed the restoration of the White House following the American Civil War.

Early life 
Patterson was born on October 25, 1828 in Greeneville, Tennessee, the eldest of Andrew Johnson and Eliza McCardle's five children.

She attended local schools in the Greeneville, Tennessee area. While her father was serving in the U.S. House of Representatives, Patterson attended Miss L.S. English's Female Seminary in Georgetown (later known as the Georgetown Female Seminary) and spent time at the White House during the term of James K. Polk.

Marriage 
She married David T. Patterson on December 13, 1855. The couple had two children, a son named Andrew Johnson Patterson (1857–1932) and a daughter named Mary Belle Patterson Landstreet (1859–1891). Mary died during the same year as her father, who died on November 3.

After the American Civil War and the readmission of Tennessee as a state in 1866, her husband was elected to her father's seat in the United States Senate.

First Daughter 
Patterson's father, Andrew Johnson became President of the United States after the assassination of Abraham Lincoln in 1865. Her mother, First Lady Eliza McCardle Johnson, suffered from ill health and had little interest in social functions, so Patterson took over hostess responsibilities. Eliza made only two public appearances during her tenure as First Lady. Patterson was a popular figure in Washington and set a friendly tone for White House social functions. She disarmed onlookers by announcing, "We are plain folks from Tennessee, called here by a national calamity. I hope not much will be expected of us."

In keeping with her image as a country girl, Patterson brought two Jersey cows to the White House. The cows pastured on the lawn and Patterson milked them daily, "don[ning] a calico dress and a spotless apron." Just before the execution of Mary Surratt, her daughter Anna came to the White House, hoping to persuade Johnson to spare her mother's life. Denied access to the president, she lay weeping on the stairs to his office and was comforted by Patterson, who said there was nothing she could do to stop it.

The White House had fallen into disrepair after the Civil War. Much of the furniture was dirty and broken, the walls and floors were stained with tobacco juice, and the entire house was infested with insects. Patterson oversaw a $30,000 renovation of the White House. She hung new wallpaper, slipcovered old furniture, and used muslin cloth to cover the carpets during receptions. During her remodel of the White House, Patterson discovered a series of George P. A. Healy presidential portraits that were originally commissioned by Congress in 1857. Patterson framed and displayed them in the Transverse Hall where they can still be seen.

In the 1982 Siena College Research Institute asking historians to assess American first ladies, Patterson and several other non-spousal White House hostesses were included. The first ladies survey, which has been conducted periodically since, ranks first ladies according to a cumulative score on the independent criteria of their background, value to the country, intelligence, courage, accomplishments, integrity, leadership, being their own women, public image, and value to the president. In the 1982 survey, out of 42 first ladies and other White House hostesses, Patterson was assessed as the 32nd most highly regarded among historians. Non-spousal White House hostesses such as Patterson have been excluded from subsequent iterations of this survey.

Later life 
Patterson died on July 10, 1901. She is buried in Andrew Johnson National Cemetery in Greeneville, Tennessee.

References

1828 births
1901 deaths
19th-century American women
20th-century American women
Andrew Johnson family
People from Greeneville, Tennessee
Children of presidents of the United States
Children of vice presidents of the United States
Acting first ladies of the United States